The Chicago Film Critics Association Award for Best Editing is an annual award given by the Chicago Film Critics Association since 2012.

Winners

2010s

2020s

References

See also
Academy Award for Best Film Editing

Chicago Film Critics Association Awards
Awards established in 2012
Film editing awards